A nithing pole, sometimes normalized as nithstang or nidstang, was a pole used for cursing an enemy in Germanic pagan tradition.

Historical use
A nithing pole consisted of a long, wooden pole with a recently cut horse head at the end, and at times with the skin of the horse laid over the pole. The nithing pole was directed towards the enemy and target of the curse. The curse could be carved in runes on the pole.

Attestations
A nithing pole event appears in Egils saga:
"And when all was ready for sailing, Egil went up into the island. He took in his hand a hazel-pole, and went to a rocky eminence that looked inward to the mainland. Then he took a horse's head and fixed it on the pole. After that, in solemn form of curse, he thus spake: 'Here set I up a curse-pole, and this curse I turn on king Eric and queen Gunnhilda. (Here he turned the horse's head landwards.) This curse I turn also on the guardian-spirits who dwell in this land, that they may all wander astray, nor reach or find their home till they have driven out of the land king Eric and Gunnhilda.' This spoken, he planted the pole down in a rift of the rock, and let it stand there. The horse's head he turned inwards to the mainland; but on the pole he cut runes, expressing the whole form of curse." - Egils Saga, Chapter LX (60)

The Icelandic Vatnsdæla saga records that when Finbogi failed to show up for a hólmganga (duel), Jökul raised a nithing pole against Finbogi for his cowardice by carving out a human head which was placed on a post with magic runes, killing a mare, and then placing the post into the mare's breast with the head facing towards Finbogi's dwelling.

Contemporary use
In Iceland there are modern examples of a nithing pole being raised. It is thought that the tradition has continued unbroken since the settlement of Iceland. A notable example from 2006 happened when a farmer in Bíldudalur, claiming direct descent from Egill Skallagrímsson, raised a pole with a calf's head attached against another local man with a note attached to the effect that he would not rest until the man was either outlawed or dead. The reason the nithing pole was raised was that the man had run over the former's puppy. The matter was reported to the police as a death threat. 

In 2006 a local politician in Norway raised several sheep-head nithing poles in protest of a local election.

Some modern pagans have used the nithing pole as a curse against white supremacists, to reclaim pagan symbolism. 

Improvised nithing poles with dried cod heads were used during the April 4, 2016 demonstration against Icelandic Prime Minister Sigmundur Davíð Gunnlaugsson.

On April 3, 2020, a nithing pole with two svið was put up in front of Alþingi in Iceland. A sign on the pole cited that the government has been treating working classes that are predominantly female poorly, for example, lowering the pay of nurses during the COVID-19 pandemic. The pole claimed to turn that around on Alþingi with the curse.

On April 29, 2022 a nithing pole was discovered by Sólsetrið in Iceland.

See also
Hoodening
Horse sacrifice
Nīþ
 Poles in mythology

Notes

Curses
Magical terms in Germanic mysticism